Ruck Zuck (which loosely translated means "instantly" or "right now") is a remix album by KMFDM, featuring remixed tracks from their previous full-length release, Hau Ruck.

Track listing

References

Metropolis catalog entry

2006 EPs
KMFDM albums
2006 remix albums
Remix EPs
Metropolis Records remix albums
Industrial remix albums